The 2016–17 Macedonian Football Cup was the 25th season of Macedonia's football knockout competition. Shkëndija are the defending champions, having won their first title in the previous year.

Competition calendar

First round
The matches were played on 16, 17, 24, and 31 August 2016.

|colspan="3" style="background-color:#97DEFF" align=center|16 August 2016

|-
|colspan="3" style="background-color:#97DEFF" align=center|17 August 2016

|-
|colspan="3" style="background-color:#97DEFF" align=center|24 August 2016

|-
|colspan="3" style="background-color:#97DEFF" align=center|31 August 2016

|-
|colspan="3" style="background-color:#97DEFF" align=center|N/A

|}

Second round
Entering this round are the 14 winners from the First Round and Bregalnica Shtip who got a bye to this round. Mladost Carev Dvor withdrew from the competition, so their opponents Metalurg got a bye to the next round. The draw was held on 2 September 2016. The first legs were played on 21 September and the second legs were played on 12 and 19 October 2016.

||colspan="2" rowspan="1" 
|}

Quarter-finals
The first legs were played on 23 November 2016 and the second legs played on 7 December 2016.

|}

Semi-finals
The first legs were played on 1 March 2017 and the return legs played on 19 April 2017.

Summary

|}

Matches

Shkëndija won 3–2 on aggregate.

Pelister won 3–2 on aggregate.

Final

See also
2016–17 Macedonian First Football League
2016–17 Macedonian Second Football League

References

External links
 Official Website

Macedonia
Cup
Macedonian Football Cup seasons